Lia (fried paddy) is a prepared food from rice mainly consumed in the region of Odisha, India.  The other varieties are Khai (fried paddy) and Ukhuda (fried paddy sweetened by jaggery). It is a form of puffed rice (Rice puffs while roasting it with heated sand) which is added with jaggery syrup. "Kora khai", a derived food from "khai" is offered to Lingaraja in Lingaraja temple, Bhubaneswar.

References 

Indian rice dishes
Rice dishes
Odia cuisine